Gary Collins may refer to:

 Gary Collins (ice hockey) (born 1935), Canadian ice hockey player
 Gary Collins (actor) (1938–2012), American actor and television host
 Gary Collins (American football) (born 1940), American football player
 Gary Collins (Idaho politician) (born 1942), American politician
 Gary Collins (baseball coach) (born 1947), American baseball coach
 Gary Collins (racing driver) (born 1960), American stock car racing driver
 Gary Collins (Canadian politician) (born 1963), Canadian politician

See also
 Gary Collins-Simpson (born 1961), Canadian swimmer